Surafiel Tesfamicael (born 17 March 1989) is an Eritrean footballer. He currently plays for the Eritrea national football team.

International career
Tesfamichael played in the 2009 CECAFA Cup in Kenya, appearing as a substitute in the 4–0 quarter-final defeat to Tanzania.

References

External links

Living people
1989 births
Eritrean footballers
Eritrea international footballers
Association football defenders
Sportspeople from Asmara